The men's doubles competition of the 2019 World Table Tennis Championships was held from 22 to 27 April 2019. Fan Zhendong and Xu Xin were the defending champions but neither of them competed this year.

Ma Long and Wang Chuqin won the title after defeating Ovidiu Ionescu and Álvaro Robles 11–3, 8–11, 11–7, 11–3, 11–5.

Seeds

  Masataka Morizono /  Yuya Oshima (second round)
  Ho Kwan Kit /  Wong Chun Ting (quarterfinals)
  Jeoung Young-sik /  Lee Sang-su (quarterfinals)
  Mattias Falck /  Kristian Karlsson (quarterfinals)
  Nándor Ecseki /  Ádám Szudi (third round)
  Chen Chien-an /  Chuang Chih-yuan (third round)
  Ovidiu Ionescu /  Álvaro Robles (final)
  Liang Jingkun /  Lin Gaoyuan (semifinals)
  Ng Pak Nam /  Lam Siu Hang (second round)
  Martin Allegro /  Florent Lambiet (first round)
  Timo Boll /  Patrick Franziska (quarterfinals, withdrew)
  Jang Woo-jin /  Park Gang-hyeon (third round)
  Lin Yun-ju /  Wang Tai-wei (third round)
  Robert Gardos /  Daniel Habesohn (second round)
  Jonathan Groth /  Liam Pitchford (third round)
  Tomokazu Harimoto /  Yuto Kizukuri (third round)
  Eric Jouti /  Gustavo Tsuboi (second round)
  Ma Long /  Wang Chuqin  (champions)
  Marek Badowski /  Patryk Zatówka (first round)
  Sharath Kamal /  Sathiyan Gnanasekaran (first round)
  Robin Devos /  Cédric Nuytinck (second round)
  Tristan Flore /  Emmanuel Lebesson (third round)
  Paul Drinkhall /  Samuel Walker (first round)
  Mohamed El-Beiali /  Ahmed Saleh (second round)
  Marcelo Aguirre /  Alejandro Toranzos (first round)
  Pavel Platonov /  Vladimir Samsonov (second round)
  Samuel Kalužný /  Ľubomír Pištej (first round)
  Padasak Tanviriyavechakul /  Supanut Wisutmaythangkoon (first round)
  Hu Heming /  Kane Townsend (first round)
  Anthony Amalraj /  Manav Vikash Thakkar (first round)
  Vitor Ishiy /  Thiago Monteiro (second round)
  Anton Källberg /  Truls Möregårdh (second round)

Draw

Finals

Top half

Section 1

Section 2

Bottom half

Section 3

Section 4

References

External links
Draw

Men's doubles